Wilis may refer to:
Mount Wilis
 Wili, a type of  supernatural being in Slavic folklore
Giselle or Giselle ou les Wilis, a ballet

See also
Wili (disambiguation)
Willis (disambiguation)
Wills (disambiguation)